Amata shoa is a moth of the family Erebidae. It was described by George Hampson in 1898. It is found in Ethiopia and Sudan.

References

 

shoa
Moths described in 1898
Moths of Africa